Valmai Slater (born 16 January 1933 in Norman Park, Queensland) is an Australian former cricket player. Slater played one test for the Australia national women's cricket team.

References

1933 births
Australia women Test cricketers
Living people